Timothy McSweeney's Quarterly Concern is an American literary journal, founded in 1998, typically containing short stories, reportage, and illustrations. Some issues also include poetry, comic strips, and novellas. The Quarterly Concern is published by McSweeney's based in San Francisco and it has been edited by Dave Eggers. The journal is notable in that it has no fixed format, and changes its publishing style from issue to issue, unlike more conventional journals and magazines.

The first issue featured only works that had been rejected by other publications, but the journal has since begun publishing pieces written with McSweeney's in mind.

History
McSweeney's was founded in 1998 after Dave Eggers left an editing position at Esquire, during the same time he was working on A Heartbreaking Work of Staggering Genius. McSweeney's is a sort of successor to Eggers' earlier magazine project Might, although Might was focused on editorial content and news, and not literature. Eggers also refers to McSweeney's as having "less edge" than Might.

Although originally reaching only a small audience, McSweeney's has grown to be a well respected journal, with Ruth Franklin, writing for Slate, referring to the Quarterly (and company) as "...the first bona fide literary movement in decades". In 2013, NPR wrote about the company's fifteenth anniversary, and referred to the journal as the "flagship literary quarterly" of a "literary empire based in San Francisco".

Authors
Notable authors featured in McSweeney's include Denis Johnson, William T. Vollmann, Joyce Carol Oates, Jonathan Lethem, Michael Chabon, Susan Straight, Roddy Doyle, T. Coraghessan Boyle, Steven Millhauser, Robert Coover, Stephen King, David Foster Wallace and Ann Beattie. The Quarterly has also helped launch the careers of dozens of emerging writers, including Philipp Meyer, Wells Tower, and Rebecca Curtis.

Awards
In 2007, McSweeney's received the National Magazine Award for Fiction for three stories published in 2006: "Wild Child" by T.C. Boyle (Issue 19); "To Sit, Unmoving" by Susan Steinberg (author) (Issue 20); and "The Strange Career of Dr. Raju Gopalarajan" by Rajesh Parameswaran (Issue 21). 

In 2010, Anthony Doerr, Wells Tower, and Kevin Moffett won the National Magazine Awards for their stories "Memory Wall", "Raw Water", and "Further Interpretations of Real-Life Events", respectively, all published in Issue 32.

Published issues
McSweeney's publishes each issue in a different format. Past issues have ranged in format from simple hardcovers or softcovers to more unconventional configurations, such as newspapers, a bundle of mail, a box emblazoned with a man's sweaty head, and a deck of playing cards. Some issues feature writing exclusively or mostly from one geographic area, such as Issue 15, which contained half American and half Icelandic writing.

In Issue 10, it was claimed that exactly 56 issues of the journal would be published. In Issue 20, this claim was repeated in an advertisement that stated: "There will be roughly thirty-six [issues] to come; then, a five-year retrenchment." With the publication of Issue 56 it was revealed that this had always been a joke and that they would continue to publish until at least issue 156.

Notes

Anthologies
Created in Darkness by Troubled Americans: The Best of McSweeney's Humor Category (Alfred A. Knopf, 2004)
The Best of McSweeney's, Volume 1 (Hamish Hamilton, 2004)
The Best of McSweeney's, Volume 2 (Hamish Hamilton, 2005)
The Better of McSweeney's: Volume One — Issues 1 – 10, Stories and Letters (McSweeney's Books, 2005)
The Best of McSweeney's (McSweeney's Books, 2013)

References

External links
 
Tai Moses, "Mighty Muse", a 1998 review of the debut issue, from the Silicon Valley online weekly Metroactive.
Matt Goldberg, "Mighty McSweeney's: David Eggers's Quarterly Builds a Following"(interview), The Village Voice, March 23, 1999. 
"Review of Literary Magazines: McSweeney's" by Martin Riker, a 1999 review from Context, at the Center for Book Culture.org.
Ruth Franklin, "The 98-Pound Gorilla in the Room" by Ruth Franklin, a review of Issue 10 and the "McSweeney's short story", from Slate.com, April 3, 2003.
Mark Holcomb, "Amazing Stories: Michael Chabon's Dime-Store Serenade", a review of Issue 10 from The Village Voice, April 8, 2003.

McSweeney's periodicals
Quarterly magazines published in the United States
Literary magazines published in the United States
Magazines established in 1998
1998 establishments in California
Magazines published in San Francisco